Rayón is a small town surrounded by its  municipal area in the center of the  Mexican state of Sonora at a distance of 110 kilometers from the state capital Hermosillo.

Area and Population
The population of the municipal seat was 1,273 in 2000.  It is located at an elevation of 618 meters.

Transport

There are highway connections with Ures (41 kilometers), Carbó (48 kilometers), and Opodepe (26 kilometers).

History
Rayón was founded in 1638, by the Jesuit missionary Pedro Pantoja, who gave it the name of Nuestra Señora del Rosario de Nacameri; the area had been inhabited by the Pima Bajos.  In 1825 the name was changed to Rayón to honor General Ignacio López Rayón.  In 1850 it was given the category of villa and in the middle of the nineteenth century it was a municipality belonging to the district of Ures.  An important date is the beginning of the construction of the church which still is in use today.

Health and education
There were 7 schools and one doctor in 2000. Gobierno de Sonora

Economic Activity
The main economic activity is cattle raising.  In 2000 the census counted over 18,000 head of cattle.

External links
Rayón, Ayuntamiento Digital  (Official Website of Rayón, Sonora)

References
 Enciclopedia de los Municipios de Mexico 
 INEGI
 Gobierno de Sonora 

Populated places in Sonora